Somerfield is a suburb in the south of Christchurch, New Zealand. It is nominally bordered by the Ōpāwaho / Heathcote River to the south and west, Strickland and Colombo Streets to the east, and Milton Street to the north. The suburb includes Somerfield School, Somerfield Park and a small number of shops which service the local area, although it is predominantly residential. Somerfield is also known for its wide variety of trees, especially along the banks of the Ōpāwaho / Heathcote River.

Etymology
Edward Bishop, an early Mayor of Christchurch, was born at Somerfield House in Maidstone, Kent, England in 1811. He came to Christchurch on the Charlotte Jane with all his siblings, and together with his youngest brother Frederick Augustus Bishop (1818–1894) bought land south of Christchurch along the Ōpāwaho / Heathcote River. They called their farm Somerfield, after their birthplace, and they appear on both the 1853 jury list and electoral roll as living there.  Somerfield has since been adopted for the name of the suburb in that part of Christchurch. The  property was in 1864 owned by Richard Packer, who in turn passed it on to his son Henry William Packer (1831–1890).

Demographics

Somerfield had a population of 6,783 at the 2018 New Zealand census, an increase of 9 people (0.1%) since the 2013 census, and an increase of 267 people (4.1%) since the 2006 census. There were 2,649 households. There were 3,216 males and 3,564 females, giving a sex ratio of 0.9 males per female, with 1,302 people (19.2%) aged under 15 years, 1,140 (16.8%) aged 15 to 29, 3,168 (46.7%) aged 30 to 64, and 1,176 (17.3%) aged 65 or older.

Ethnicities were 89.6% European/Pākehā, 8.0% Māori, 1.9% Pacific peoples, 6.6% Asian, and 2.3% other ethnicities (totals add to more than 100% since people could identify with multiple ethnicities).

The proportion of people born overseas was 21.7%, compared with 27.1% nationally.

Although some people objected to giving their religion, 54.9% had no religion, 33.6% were Christian, 0.8% were Hindu, 0.5% were Muslim, 0.9% were Buddhist and 2.5% had other religions.

Of those at least 15 years old, 1,593 (29.1%) people had a bachelor or higher degree, and 828 (15.1%) people had no formal qualifications. The employment status of those at least 15 was that 2,793 (51.0%) people were employed full-time, 804 (14.7%) were part-time, and 162 (3.0%) were unemployed.

Education
Somerfield Te Kura Wairepo is a contributing primary school for years 1 to 6 with a roll of  students. The school opened in 1911.

Cashmere High School, Te iringa o Kahukura is a secondary school for years 9 to 13 with a roll of  students. The school opened in 1956 as Cashmere High School, and gained its Māori name of Te iringa o Kahukura in 1972.

Both schools are coeducational. Rolls are as of

References

Populated places in Canterbury, New Zealand
Suburbs of Christchurch